Gretchen C. F. Shappert is an attorney. She has served as the United States Attorney for the Western District of North Carolina from 2004 to 2009 and the United States Attorney for the District of the Virgin Islands from 2018 to 2022.

Shappert passed the North Carolina bar in 1980. She graduated from Duke University in 1977, and from Washington and Lee Law School. She was in private practice and was an assistant district attorney and an assistant public defender in Charlotte before becoming a federal prosecutor.

Shappert stressed tough prosecution of drug offenders while in office. Shappert also served as chair of the Justice Department's subcommittee on Native American issues. Shappert also opposed retroactively lessening prison sentences related to crack-cocaine.

Shappert resigned as U.S. Attorney for the Western District of North Carolina in March 2009. In addition to prosecuting serious drug offenses, Shappert is also keenly interested in anti-terrorism efforts.  Shappert recently published an article about Attorney General Amos Akerman's leadership in prosecuting the Ku Klux Klan immediately after the civil war in what Shappert describes as "the worst outbreak of domestic violence in American history to date."
Shappert has also co-authored an article on the Crime Fraud Exception to the Attorney-Client Privilege. DOJ Journal of Federal Law and Practice, May 2021 

Shappert became the Court-appointed U.S. Attorney for the Virgin Islands on April 23, 2018. On February 8, 2021, she along with 55 other Trump-era attorneys were asked to resign. She has not resigned as of December 31, 2021. On September 28, 2021, Joe Biden nominated Assistant U.S. Attorney Delia Smith to serve as the U.S. Attorney.

References

Sources 
Transcript of testimony of Shappert before House Judiciary Committee

External links

Year of birth missing (living people)
Living people
21st-century American women
20th-century American women lawyers
20th-century American lawyers
21st-century American women lawyers
21st-century American lawyers
District attorneys in North Carolina
North Carolina lawyers
Public defenders
United States Attorneys for the Western District of North Carolina
United States Attorneys for the District of the Virgin Islands